Queen of All Ears is an album by the American band the Lounge Lizards, released in 1998. It was the band's final album. 

"The First and Royal Queen" was used at the end of episodes of Painting with John. The band supported the album with an international tour.

Production
The album was produced by John Lurie and Pat Dillett. The tracks were written by Lurie, with bass player Erik Sanko cowriting two. Jane Scarpantoni played cello on Queen of All Ears; in total, nine musicians played on the album. 

Released on Lurie's own label, it was originally intended for Luaka Bop; legal issues delayed the release for two years. Lurie considered writing a book about the ordeal, to be titled What Do You Know About Music? You're Not a Lawyer. The account was later told in Lurie's memoir The History of Bones (2021). Lurie's 2021 book also apologized to David Tronzo because a song intended as a showcase for Tronzo was ultimately cut from the album and thus the guitarist did not perform a solo on the recording.

Critical reception

JazzTimes wrote that "the music relies heavily on group improvisation in the highly colored riffs and patterns that form the basis of most of the proceedings." Esquire determined that Lurie's "alto and soprano saxophoning has become something rather nice: plaintive, searching, Colemanesque, quite at home (soaring) in the upper registers." The Boston Globe opined that "New York's fringe-crawlers mature with impressionistic etchings of chamber jazz and world music."

The Guardian stated that "the Lounge Lizards roll from moments of prayer-like intensity—Coltranesque flourishes over African pulsing—to Charles Mingus doing the music for scary Czech cartoons, to blasting Dragnet rumbles." The Chicago Tribune opined that the album "embarks on an Amer-Euro-Afro fake jazz cruise brimming with trans-global eclecticism, defanged Mingus/Monk moves and sometimes striking instrumental explosions."

AllMusic wrote that "John Lurie's so-called 'non-jazz' approach is in full flower on this fascinating record."

Track listing
All tracks composed by John Lurie; except where noted.

Personnel
Lounge Lizard
John Lurie - tenor and alto saxophone
Michael Blake - tenor saxophone, bass clarinet
Steven Benstein - trumpet
David Tronzo - slide guitar
Erik Sanko - bass
Evan Lurie - piano, organ
Calvin Weston - drums
Ben Perowsky - percussion
Jane Scarpantoni - cello

References

1998 albums
The Lounge Lizards albums
albums produced by Pat Dillett